Paliana is a genus of parasitic flies in the family Tachinidae. There are at least two described species in Paliana.

Species
These two species belong to the genus Paliana:
 Paliana basalis Curran, 1927
 Paliana phasioides (Walker, 1858)

References

Further reading

 
 
 
 

Tachinidae
Articles created by Qbugbot